History of the Russian Revolution is a two-volume book by Leon Trotsky on the Russian Revolution of 1917. The first volume is dedicated to the political history of the February Revolution and the October Revolution, to explain the relations between these two events. The book was initially published in Germany in 1930. The original language is Russian, but it was translated into English by Max Eastman in 1932; in the English translation the second volume, originally consisting of two parts, is split into two volumes. The book was considered anti-stalinist in the Soviet Union and only made it to publication in Russia as late as in 1997.

Concept and creation 
The Russian Revolution of 1917 was a major event in history that changed the world. It was the first time in history that the toiled masses had successfully established their own rule. After the revolution the Union of Soviet Socialist Republics (USSR) was born, which further eliminated poverty, established free medicine and highly subsidized housing, free education, and job security. Famous American journalist John Reed described the Russian Revolution in the following words in his famous Ten Days That Shook the World book:No matter what one thinks of Bolshevism, it is undeniable that the Russian Revolution is one of the great events of human history, and the rise of the Bolsheviki a phenomenon of worldwide importance. Just as historians search the records for the minutest details of the story of the Paris Commune, so they will want to know what happened in Petrograd in November, 1917, the spirit which animated the people, and how the leaders looked, talked and acted.Leon Trotsky was a leading leader of the Bolshevik Revolution along with Vladimir Lenin. He was expelled from the party and exiled by Joseph Stalin. He tried to take refuge in different countries and was able to take refuge in Mexico but was finally murdered in 1940. During his exile period in Turkey, Trotsky wrote this book on the isle of Prinkipo.

The History of Russian Revolution recreates the story of the Bolshevik revolution. The important quality of this book is its ability to be a memory and an account of a major historical event by a participant and theorist. 

The book is divided among three volumes which are: "The Overthrow of Tzarism", "The Attempted Counter-Revolution" and "The Triumph of the Soviets". Their brief description is as below;

 Volume one deals with the overthrow of the Tsar.
 Volume two covers the period from the 'July Days'.
 Volume three deals with the national question, the preparation of power, and the October insurrection.

It is considered an important and unique work as a history of a major event written by someone who took a leading role in it.

Publication 
The basic motivation of Trotsky behind writing this piece was to translate the experience of the revolution into both a teaching tool and a weapon in the revolution. Isaac Deutscher, Trotsky's biographer, described The History of the Russian Revolution as Trotsky's,"Crowning work, both in scale and power and as the fullest expression of his ideas on revolution." Trotsky himself says "The history of a revolution, like every other history, ought first of all to tell what happened and how. That however is, little enough. From the very telling it ought to become clear why it happened thus and not otherwise." In his note about the author in the first English translation, Eastman wrote that "this present work [...] will take its place in the record of Trotsky's life [...] as one of the supreme achievements of this versatile and powerful mind and will".In 2017, on the centennial of the Russian Revolution famous writer Tariq Ali reviewed the book and wrote that"This passionate, partisan, and beautifully written account by a major participant in the revolution, written during his exile on the isle of Prinkipo in Turkey, remains one of the best accounts of 1917. No counter-revolutionary, conservative or liberal, has been able to compete with this telling."

See also
 Bibliography of the Russian Revolution and Civil War
 Leon Trotsky bibliography

References

External links 
 The History of the Russian Revolution. The whole book at the Marxists Internet Archive.

1932 non-fiction books
Communist books
Books about the Russian Revolution
Revolutions
History books about the Russian Revolution
Works by Leon Trotsky
Books about Trotskyism